was a Japanese samurai warrior and Date clan leader during the Sengoku period.

Biography
He was born as the eldest son of Date Hisamune. His childhood name was Jiro (次郎).

At the death of his father, he became daimyō of Mutsu Province.

In 1536, he promulgated the Date provincial code (Jinkaishū).

Family

 Father: Date Hisamune (1453–1514)
 Mother: Sensu'in (d. 1513)
 Wife: Teishin'in
 Concubines:
 Nakajo-dono
 Shimodate-dono
 Nakadate-dono
 Watari-dono
 Bo-dono
 Children:
 daughter married Souma Akitane by Teishin'in
 daughter by Teishin'in
 daughter married Ashina Moriuji
 Date Harumune by Teishin'in
 Date Genbanmaru by Teishin'in
 Osaki Yoshinobu (1526–1550) by Teishin'in
 Date Sanemoto (1527–1587) by Nakajo-dono
 daughter married Nikaido Teruyuki by Shimodate-dono
 daughter married Tamura Takaaki by Shimodate-dono
 Date Munetoshi by Shimodate-dono
 Daughter married Kakketa Toshimune by Shimodate-dono
 Yanagawa Munekiyo (1532–1605) by Nakadate-dono
 Ogata Yasuaji by Nakadate-dono
 Watari Motomune (1530–1594) by Watari-dono
 Watari Tsunamune by Watari-dono
 Kori Munesada by Bo-dono
 Kasai Ushisarumaru by Bo-dono
 Gorakuin Munesake by Bo-dono
 Date Shichiro by Bo-dono
 Kosugo gozen married Sōma Yoshitane (1558-1635) by Bo-dono

Retainers

Notes

References

Fukushima Prefecture (1969), Fukushima Kenshi, Vol. 1. Fukushima Prefectural Government.
Miyagi Prefecture (1957), Miyagi Kenshi, Vol. 1. Miyagi Kenshi Kankōkai.

Daimyo
1488 births
1565 deaths
Date clan